The Honinbo (本因坊) is a Go competition and the oldest Go title in Japan. Sponsored by Mainichi Shimbun, the Honinbo pays out ¥32 million ($415,000 as of October 2011).

Rules
The holder of the title is challenged by whoever wins the round robin league. Players can get into the round robin league by going through many preliminary tournaments. Once there is a challenger to compete against the holder, the winner is decided through a best of seven match. The games are played over two days and each player is given eight hours of thinking time. If a player qualifies for the Honinbo league, they are automatically promoted to 7 dan. If that same player wins the league, a promotion to 8 dan is given. If that same player goes on to win the title, they are promoted to 9 dan, the highest rank.

Past winners

References

External links
 Honinbo Title
 Honinbo title games

Go competitions in Japan

ja:本因坊#本因坊戦